Vashon Hardware Store, now known as The Hardware Store Restaurant, is a commercial building in Vashon, Washington. Built in 1890, it was added to the National Register of Historic Places in 2000.

Description

Vashon Hardware Store consists of two wood-frame structures that share an external facade. The main building is one-and-a-half stories and measures . The smaller building measures . The side-by-side buildings were constructed around 1890. Internal connections between the two buildings were added in 1973.

History

Frank Gorsuch built the original structure and operated it as a general store, the first in Vashon and the fourth on Vashon Island. In 1913, the business was sold to Fred and Henry Weiss who named it Weiss Bros. General Merchandise. The building was renamed Vashon Hardware Store in 1929 when it was purchased by George McCormick and C. G. Kimmel.

After years as a retail store run by members of the McCormick family, it was reopened as a restaurant in 2005.

References

		
National Register of Historic Places in King County, Washington
Early Commercial architecture in the United States
Moderne architecture in the United States
Commercial buildings completed in 1890